El Hassi may refer to:

 El Hassi, Batna, a municipality or commune of Batna province, Algeria
 El Hassi, Relizane, a municipality or commune of Relizane province, Algeria